The 2014 Six-red World Championship (often styled the 2014 SangSom 6-red World Championship for sponsorship and marketing purposes) was a six-red snooker tournament held between 1 and 6 September 2014 at the Montien Riverside Hotel in Bangkok, Thailand.

Mark Selby was to take part in the tournament, but he was replaced by Andrew Pagett due to a stomach bug.

Mark Davis was the defending champion, but lost 2–6 against Kritsanut Lertsattayathorn in the last 16.

Stephen Maguire won in the final 8–7 against Ricky Walden.

Prize money
The breakdown of prize money for this year is shown below:
 Winner: 2,500,000 baht
 Runner-up: 1,000,000 baht
 Semi-finalists: 500,000 baht
 Quarter-finalists: 250,000 baht
 Last 16: 125,000 baht
 Last 32: 62,500 baht
 Group stage: 31,250 baht
 Total: 8,000,000 baht

Round-robin stage
The top four players from each group qualified for the knock-out stage. All matches were best of 9 frames.

Group A

 Ben Judge 5–2 Ratchayothin Yotharuck
 Dominic Dale 5–3 Ken Doherty
 Mark Davis 5–3 Ratchayothin Yotharuck
 Ben Judge 5–1 Thor Chuan Leong
 Mark Davis 3–5 Ken Doherty
 Thor Chuan Leong 1–5 Ratchayothin Yotharuck
 Ken Doherty 5–4 Ben Judge
 Dominic Dale 5–0 Ratchayothin Yotharuck
 Mark Davis 5–1 Ben Judge
 Dominic Dale 5–0 Thor Chuan Leong
 Mark Davis 5–0 Thor Chuan Leong
 Dominic Dale 5–0 Ben Judge
 Ken Doherty 5–1 Thor Chuan Leong
 Mark Davis 1–5 Dominic Dale
 Ken Doherty 5–1 Ratchayothin Yotharuck

Group B

 Hossein Vafaei 5–1 Hung Chuang Ming
 Michael White 5–4 Noppon Saengkham
 Michael Holt 5–2 Hung Chuang Ming
 Andrew Pagett 1–5 Noppon Saengkham
 Michael White 3–5 Hossein Vafaei
 Hung Chuang Ming 4–5 Noppon Saengkham
 Andrew Pagett 3–5 Michael White
 Michael Holt 5–4 Noppon Saengkham
 Andrew Pagett 4–5 Hossein Vafaei
 Michael Holt 5–2 Michael White
 Andrew Pagett 5–0 Hung Chuang Ming
 Michael Holt 1–5 Hossein Vafaei
 Michael White 5–0 Hung Chuang Ming
 Andrew Pagett 4–5 Michael Holt
 Hossein Vafaei 3–5 Noppon Saengkham

Group C

 Mohsen Bukshaisha 5–3 Ehsan Heidarinejad
 Jimmy White 5–3 Boonyarit Keattikun
 Ryan Day 5–3 Ehsan Heidarinejad
 Mohsen Bukshaisha 5–4 Boonyarit Keattikun
 Barry Hawkins 5–2 Jimmy White
 Ehsan Heidarinejad 4–5 Boonyarit Keattikun
 Ryan Day 5–1 Jimmy White
 Barry Hawkins 2–5 Boonyarit Keattikun
 Jimmy White 5–3 Mohsen Bukshaisha
 Barry Hawkins 3–5 Ryan Day
 Barry Hawkins 4–5 Ehsan Heidarinejad
 Ryan Day 5–1 Mohsen Bukshaisha
 Jimmy White 2–5 Ehsan Heidarinejad
 Barry Hawkins 5–4 Mohsen Bukshaisha
 Ryan Day 2–5 Boonyarit Keattikun

Group D

 Shivam Arora 0–5 Amir Sarkhosh
 Shaun Murphy 5–2 Shachar Ruberg
 Shivam Arora 3–5 Thepchaiya Un-Nooh
 Robert Milkins 3–5 Amir Sarkhosh
 Shaun Murphy 3–5 Thepchaiya Un-Nooh
 Amir Sarkhosh 2–5 Thepchaiya Un-Nooh
 Shachar Ruberg 5–4 Shivam Arora
 Robert Milkins 5–3 Thepchaiya Un-Nooh
 Shaun Murphy 5–0 Shivam Arora
 Robert Milkins 4–5 Shachar Ruberg
 Shaun Murphy 5–2 Amir Sarkhosh
 Robert Milkins 5–1 Shivam Arora
 Shachar Ruberg 1–5 Thepchaiya Un-Nooh
 Shaun Murphy 5–4 Robert Milkins
 Shachar Ruberg 5–0 Amir Sarkhosh

Group E

 Steven Donohoe 2–5 Kamal Chawla
 Alex Borg 4–5 James Wattana
 Matthew Stevens 5–2 Kamal Chawla
 Steven Donohoe 2–5 James Wattana
 Ricky Walden 5–1 Alex Borg
 Alex Borg 5–3 Steven Donohoe
 Matthew Stevens 5–1 James Wattana
 Ricky Walden 4–5 Kamal Chawla
 Matthew Stevens 5–0 Alex Borg
 Ricky Walden 5–2 James Wattana
 Matthew Stevens 5–0 Steven Donohoe
 Alex Borg 4–5 Kamal Chawla
 Ricky Walden 5–0 Steven Donohoe
 Kamal Chawla 3–5 James Wattana
 Ricky Walden 5–1 Matthew StevensGroup F

 Adrian Ridley 5–0 Chaouki Yousfi
 Jamie Clarke 5–3 Kritsanut Lertsattayathorn
 Mark Williams 5–0 Chaouki Yousfi
 Adrian Ridley 1–5 Kritsanut Lertsattayathorn John Higgins 5–4 Jamie Clarke
 John Higgins 3–5 Adrian Ridley Chaouki Yousfi 1–5 Kritsanut Lertsattayathorn Mark Williams 5–3 Jamie Clarke
 John Higgins 5–2 Kritsanut Lertsattayathorn
 Mark Williams 5–2 Adrian Ridley
 John Higgins 5–2 Chaouki Yousfi
 Mark Williams 5–3 Kritsanut Lertsattayathorn
 Jamie Clarke 5–2 Chaouki Yousfi
 John Higgins 5–4 Mark Williams
 Jamie Clarke 5–1 Adrian Ridley

Group G

 Gareth Allen 5–4 Muhammad Asif
 Stuart Bingham 5–2 Graeme Dott
 Andreas Ploner 1–5 Dechawat Poomjaeng Graeme Dott 5–1 Muhammad Asif
 Stuart Bingham 5–1 Andreas Ploner
 Muhammad Asif 2–5 Dechawat Poomjaeng Andreas Ploner 5–3 Gareth Allen
 Graeme Dott 5–3 Dechawat Poomjaeng
 Stuart Bingham 5–3 Gareth Allen
 Graeme Dott 5–1 Andreas Ploner
 Stuart Bingham 5–4 Muhammad Asif
 Gareth Allen 2–5 Dechawat Poomjaeng Andreas Ploner 2–5 Muhammad Asif Graeme Dott 5–2 Gareth Allen
 Stuart Bingham 5–2 Dechawat Poomjaeng 	

Group H

 Kacper Filipiak 5–0 Ahmed Galal
 Liang Wenbo 5–1 Thanawat Thirapongpaiboon
 Joe Perry 5–3 Ahmed Galal
 Kacper Filipiak 5–2 Thanawat Thirapongpaiboon
 Stephen Maguire 3–5 Liang Wenbo Stephen Maguire 5–1 Ahmed Galal
 Liang Wenbo 5–0 Kacper Filipiak
 Joe Perry 4–5 Thanawat Thirapongpaiboon Stephen Maguire 5–0 Kacper Filipiak
 Joe Perry 5–4 Liang Wenbo
 Ahmed Galal 3–5 Thanawat Thirapongpaiboon Joe Perry 5–1 Kacper Filipiak
 Stephen Maguire 5–1 Thanawat Thirapongpaiboon
 Liang Wenbo 5–2 Ahmed Galal
 Stephen Maguire 5'–0 Joe Perry

Knockout stage

 Maximum breaks 
(Note:'' A maximum break in six-red snooker is 75.)
 Muhammad Asif
 Ken Doherty
 John Higgins
 Kritsanut Lertsattayathorn
 Robert Milkins

References

External links
 

2014
2014 in Thai sport
2014 in snooker
September 2014 sports events in Asia